The British Embassy in Chișinău is the United Kingdom's diplomatic mission to Moldova. It is located on 18 Nicolae Iorga str.

History

The United Kingdom, together with EU partners, recognised Moldova on 31 December 1991. A resident British Embassy opened in Chisinau in 2002 (until April 2002, the Ambassador to Moldova was resident in Bucharest, and the position was held concurrently by the Ambassador to Romania). The Embassy moved to its current purpose-built premises, at 18 Nicolae Iorga Street, in 2004.

See also
 List of Ambassadors from the United Kingdom to Moldova
 Embassy of Moldova, London

References

External links 
 Embassy of the United Kingdom, Chişinău official website 

Buildings and structures in Chișinău
Moldova–United Kingdom relations
United Kingdom
Chisinau